In algebraic topology, a Postnikov square is a certain cohomology operation from a first cohomology group H1 to a third cohomology group H3, introduced by .  described a generalization taking classes in Ht to H2t+1.

References

 PDF

Algebraic topology